Gino Angelo Tan Pavone (born 2 November 1988) is a Filipino international footballer who plays  as a left back or outside midfielder.

Career
Pavone began his career with Bay Area Ambassadors in 2010.

He made his international debut for the Philippines in 2010.

References

External links

1988 births
Living people
American sportspeople of Filipino descent
Citizens of the Philippines through descent
Filipino people of Italian descent
American people of Italian descent
Filipino footballers
Filipino expatriate footballers
Philippines international footballers
Association football fullbacks